The 1986–87 Northern Counties East Football League season was the 5th in the history of Northern Counties East Football League, a football competition in England. The league consisted of three divisions after Division Three was disbanded at the end of the previous season. Most of Division Three clubs were promoted to Division Two.

Premier Division

The Premier Division featured 15 clubs which competed in the previous season, along with four new clubs, promoted from Division One:
Bridlington Town
Brigg Town
Harrogate Town
North Ferriby United

League table

Division One

Division One featured ten clubs which competed in the previous season, along with eight new clubs, promoted from Division Two:
Garforth Town
Grimethorpe Miners Welfare
Hallam
Kiveton Park
Maltby Miners Welfare
BSC Parkgate
Staveley Works
York Railway Institute

League table

Division Two

Division One featured five clubs which competed in the previous season, along with 13 new clubs.
Clubs promoted from Division Three:
Collingham
Eccleshill United
Fryston Colliery Welfare
Glasshoughton Welfare
Hall Road Rangers
Selby Town
Stocksbridge Works, who also merged with Oxley Park F.C. to form Stocksbridge Park Steels F.C.
Tadcaster Albion
Wombwell Sporting Association
Worsbrough Bridge Miners Welfare
Yorkshire Amateur
Plus:
Immingham Town, joined from the Lincolnshire Football League
Winterton Rangers

League table

References

1986–87
8